Khanpur is a neighborhood in Delhi, India, situated in the South Delhi district, on the Mehrauli- Badarpur road. Its surrounding localities are Saket, Madangir, Sainik farms, Ambedkar Nagar, plus Indo-Tibetan Border Police's (ITBP) National Centre for UNCIVPOL training is also situated at Tigri in Khanpur

References

External links
Khanpur at wikimapia

Neighbourhoods in Delhi